The U.S. House Financial Services Subcommittee on Capital Markets is a subcommittee of the House Committee on Financial Services. It was previously known as the Subcommittee on Investor Protection, Entrepreneurship and Capital Markets.

Jurisdiction
The subcommittee reviews laws and programs related to the U.S. capital markets, the securities industry, and government-sponsored enterprises, such as Fannie Mae and Freddie Mac. It also oversees the Securities and Exchange Commission and self-regulatory organizations, such as the New York Stock Exchange and the Financial Industry Regulatory Authority, that police the securities markets.

In 2001 the jurisdiction over insurance was transferred to the then-House Banking and Financial Services Committee from the House Energy and Commerce Committee. Since that time it has been the purview of the Subcommittee on Capital Markets, Insurance and Government Sponsored Enterprises. But "with plans to reform Fannie Mae and Freddie Mac expected to take up much of that panel's agenda, insurance instead [was] moved to a new Subcommittee on Insurance, Housing and Community Opportunity [as of the 112th Congress]."

Members, 117th Congress

Historical membership rosters

115th Congress

116th Congress

References

External links
Official website

FinServ Investor Protection